Ahmed Samir Farag (born 20 May 1986) is an Egyptian footballer who plays for El-Daklyeh and Egyptian national football team. Farag mainly plays as a left back but can play as a left midfielder and left winger.

In June 2008, Farag was chosen to the Egypt national football team and took a place in the line-up for the five matches Egypt played in 2010 World Cup Qualifiers. He made his debut match against Congo DR on 1 June 2008.

He was included in the Egypt national under-21 football team in two successive world championships, 2005 World Youth Cup held in Netherlands and 2003 World Youth Cup in UAE. After his performance in 2003, Farag signed his first professional contract with FC Sochaux-Montbéliard at the age of 17, transferring from Al Ahly of Egypt. He was nominated for Young Player of the Year in Africa in 2005. In 2011, he won the best player prize in the Nile Basin Tournament, in Egypt. On 27 February 2014, he joined Zamalek SC for 2 and a half years.

Honours
Zamalek SC
Egypt Cup (1): 2014

References

External links

Ahmed Samir Farag at Footballdatabase

1986 births
Living people
Egyptian footballers
Egyptian expatriate footballers
Egyptian expatriate sportspeople in Romania
FC Sochaux-Montbéliard players
Egypt international footballers
2009 FIFA Confederations Cup players
Lierse S.K. players
FC Vaslui players
Belgian Pro League players
Liga I players
Expatriate footballers in France
Expatriate footballers in Belgium
Association football defenders
Egyptian expatriate sportspeople in Belgium
Egyptian expatriate sportspeople in France
Al Ahly SC players
Ismaily SC players
Zamalek SC players
Egyptian Premier League players
El Dakhleya SC players